Bidokht (also Romanized as Bīdokht or Beydokht; also known as Bidukh) is a city in the Central District of Gonabad County, Razavi Khorasan Province, Iran. At the 2006 census, its population was 4,823, in 1,392 families.

Bidokht is the seat of the Gonabadi Sufi order. In the center of the town stands Mazār-e Solṭāni, hosting the mausoleum of Solṭān-Alishāh. It is also the burial place of  Solṭān-Ḥoseyn (Sultan Hussein) Tābandeh Reżā-Alishāh and Noor-Ali Tabandeh Maḥbub-Alishāh. In 1979 Islamic revolutionary bands desecrated the mausoleum complex.

References

External links
Baydokht informatory website

Cities in Razavi Khorasan Province